Paige Madden is an American swimmer.  She came second in the 400m freestyle at the 2020 US Olympic Swimming Trials, and third in the 200m freestyle qualifying for the 2020 Olympic Games.

She is from Mobile County, Alabama and she attended the UMS-Wright Preparatory School. She qualified in Omaha to represent the USA in four swimming events. She could compete not only in the 4 by 200 relay, but also in the 100m, 400m and 800 meter freestyle races.

References

Living people
Medalists at the 2019 Summer Universiade
Universiade medalists in swimming
Universiade gold medalists for the United States
American female freestyle swimmers
Virginia Cavaliers women's swimmers
1998 births
Olympic swimmers of the United States
Swimmers at the 2020 Summer Olympics
Medalists at the 2020 Summer Olympics
Olympic silver medalists for the United States in swimming
World Aquatics Championships medalists in swimming
Medalists at the FINA World Swimming Championships (25 m)